The 1922 season was Wisła Krakóws 14th year as a club.

Friendlies

A-Klasa

League standings

Notable players

  Henryk Reyman

External links
1922 Wisła Kraków season at historiawisly.pl

Wisła Kraków seasons
Association football clubs 1922 season
Wisla